The following are a list of political scandals in the Philippines.

1940s

1950s

1960s

1970s

1980s

1990s

2000s

2010s

2020s

See also 
 Government of the Philippines
 Executive departments of the Philippines
 Corruption in the Philippines

References

 
Scandals
Philippines